June 7 - Eastern Orthodox Church calendar - June 9

All fixed commemorations below celebrated on June 21 by Orthodox Churches on the Old Calendar.

For June 8th, Orthodox Churches on the Old Calendar commemorate the Saints listed on May 26.

Saints
 Martyr Calliope (Kalliope), at Rome (c. 250)
 Martyrs Nicander and Marcian, at Dorostolum in Moesia (297 or 303)
 Martyr Mark, by the sword.
 Saint Naucratius, brother of St. Basil the Great (4th century)
 Venerable Melania the Elder, nun, of Palladius’ Lausiac History (410)
 Venerable Atre (Athre) of Nitria in Egypt (5th century)
 Saint Ephraim of Antioch, Patriarch of Antioch (545)
 Venerable Zosimas, monk, of Phoenicia (Syria) (6th century)
 Venerable Paul the Confessor, of Kaiuma Monastery in Constantinople (c. 771-775)

Pre-Schism Western saints
 Saint Maximinus of Aix, venerated as the first Bishop of Aix in Provence in France (1st century)
 Saint Sallustian of Sardinia, confessor.
 Saint Bron, a disciple of St Patrick and Bishop of Cassel-lrra near Sligo in Ireland (c. 511)
 Saint Gildard (Godard), Bishop of Rouen in France for some fifteen years (514)
 Saint Heraclius of Sens, the fourteenth Bishop of Sens in France (c. 515)
 Saints Severinus of Sanseverino (550) and Victorinus of Camerino (543), brothers who were both bishops and hermits in the 6th century.
 Saint Medardus the Wonderworker, Bishop of Noyon (c. 558)
 Venerable Levan (Selevan), who came to Cornwall and gave his name to St Levan (6th century)
 Saint Eustadiola, born in Bourges in France, as a widow she spent her fortune building Moyenmoutier Abbey, where she became a nun and abbess (690)
 Saint Chlodulf of Metz (Clodulphus, Clodulf), son of St Arnulf, Bishop of Metz, he too became Bishop of Metz, for forty years (696)
 Venerable Muirchú (Maccutinus), a holy man in Ireland who wrote Lives of St Brigid and St Patrick (7th century)
 Venerable Syra (Syria), by tradition, the sister of St Fiacre (Fiaker), an anchoress in France (7th century)  (see also: October 23 )

Post-Schism Orthodox saints
 Saint Theodore, Bishop of Rostov and Suzdal (c. 1023)
 Venerable Theophilus of Luga and Omutch (1412), disciple of St. Arsenius of Konevits.
 New monk-martyr Theophanes, at Constantinople (1559)
 Saint Nicephorus (Cantacuzene), Archdeacon, of Constantinople, who suffered under the Uniates in Marienburg, Galicia (1599)
 New Hieromartyr Theodore, Priest, of Kvelta, Georgia (1609)

Other commemorations
 Translation of the relics of Great-martyr Theodore Stratelates ("the General"), of Heraclea (319)
 Translation of the relics (1023) of Hieromartyr Alphege, abbot of Canterbury (1012)
 Uncovering of the relics (1501) of Saints Basil (1249) and Constantine (1257), Princes of Yaroslavl.
 Synaxis of the Church of the Most Holy Theotokos and the Archangel Michael (the "Michaelion"), in the Sosthenion district of Constantinople.
 Synaxis of the Church of the Cross at Mtskheta, Georgia.
 Glorification of St John of Kronstadt by the Russian Orthodox Church (1990)
 Repose of lay elder Theodore (Sokolov) of White Lake (1973)

Icons
 Yaroslavl Icon of the Most Holy Theotokos (13th century)
 Uryupinsk Icon of the Most Holy Theotokos (1821)

Icon gallery

Notes

References

Sources
 June 8/21. Orthodox Calendar (PRAVOSLAVIE.RU).
 June 21 / June 8. HOLY TRINITY RUSSIAN ORTHODOX CHURCH (A parish of the Patriarchate of Moscow).
 June 8. OCA - The Lives of the Saints.
 The Autonomous Orthodox Metropolia of Western Europe and the Americas (ROCOR). St. Hilarion Calendar of Saints for the year of our Lord 2004. St. Hilarion Press (Austin, TX). p. 42.
 The Eighth Day of the Month of June. Orthodoxy in China.
 June 8. Latin Saints of the Orthodox Patriarchate of Rome.
 The Roman Martyrology. Transl. by the Archbishop of Baltimore. Last Edition, According to the Copy Printed at Rome in 1914. Revised Edition, with the Imprimatur of His Eminence Cardinal Gibbons. Baltimore: John Murphy Company, 1916. p. 167.
 Rev. Richard Stanton. A Menology of England and Wales, or, Brief Memorials of the Ancient British and English Saints Arranged According to the Calendar, Together with the Martyrs of the 16th and 17th Centuries. London: Burns & Oates, 1892. pp. 261–263.
Greek Sources
 Great Synaxaristes:  8 ΙΟΥΝΙΟΥ. ΜΕΓΑΣ ΣΥΝΑΞΑΡΙΣΤΗΣ.
  Συναξαριστής. 8 Ιουνίου. ECCLESIA.GR. (H ΕΚΚΛΗΣΙΑ ΤΗΣ ΕΛΛΑΔΟΣ). 
  08/06/2017. Ορθόδοξος Συναξαριστής. 
Russian Sources
  21 июня (8 июня). Православная Энциклопедия под редакцией Патриарха Московского и всея Руси Кирилла (электронная версия). (Orthodox Encyclopedia - Pravenc.ru).
  8 июня по старому стилю / 21 июня по новому стилю. Русская Православная Церковь - Православный церковный календарь на 2016 год.
  8 июня (ст.ст.) 21 июня 2014 (нов. ст.). Русская Православная Церковь Отдел внешних церковных связей. (DECR).

June in the Eastern Orthodox calendar